Prochrysotus is an extinct genus of fly in the family Dolichopodidae, known from the Eocene of the Baltic region. It contains only one species, Prochrysotus magnus.

References

†
†
Prehistoric Diptera genera
†
Asilomorph flies of Europe
Baltic amber
Priabonian insects